The 14th Meril Prothom Alo Awards ceremony, presented by Prothom Alo took place on 26 April 2012, at the Bangabandhu International Conference Center in Dhaka, Bangladesh as a part of 2011–12 film awards season. The evening started off with Anisul Haque taking the podium, greeting those present. He was followed by the editor of Prothom Alo Matiur Rahman.

Facts and figures
This was 14th award ceremony of Meril Prothom Alo Awards. Guerrilla won best film awards as well as awards for Critics Choice best film director, film actress and special critics awards. Shakib Khan won the awards of his fourth time for best film actor for King Khan. Shonibar Raat Doshta Chollish Minute-e won two awards for Critics Choice best playwright and best TV actor.

Winners and nominations
15 personalities were handed out awards for various categories, selected by the readers of Prothom Alo and the Critics Award at the ceremony. Following is the list of the winners.

Lifetime Achievement Award – 2012
 Renowned artist Mustafa Manwar

Public Choice Awards – 2011

Critics' Choice Awards – 2011

Special Award – 2011
 A.T.M. Shamsuzzaman – Guerilla

Host and Jury Board
The event was hosted by Chanchal Chowdhury, Nusrat Imroz Tisha, and Mosharraf Karim. The member of Jury Board for Television section were Mita Chowdhury, Abu Sayeed, Giasuddin Selim, Moushumi and presided by Syed Monjurul Islam; and for the film section were Shahidul Islam Khokon, Ilias Kanchan, Jakir Hossain Razu, Rokeya Prachy, Kaberi Gayen and presided by Syed Salauddin Jaki.

Presenters and performances

Presenters

Performances

See also
National Film Awards
Bachsas Awards
Babisas Award

References

External links

Meril-Prothom Alo Awards ceremonies
2011 film awards
2012 awards in Bangladesh
2012 in Dhaka
April 2012 events in Bangladesh